The 2017 Kutztown Golden Bears football team represents Kutztown University of Pennsylvania in Division II football as a member of the PSAC East Division.

Schedule

References

Kutztown
Kutztown Golden Bears football seasons
Kutztown Golden Bears football